Berolina was a named passenger train between Warsaw and Berlin via Frankfurt (Oder). Introduced in 1959, it went through a number of iterations, including a short period without a name. Part of the Interexpress network as IEx 242/243 from 1986, it became categorised as EuroCity trains 42 and 43 in 1992. The service was finally replaced by the Berlin-Warszawa-Express in 2002.

Berolina is reintroduced as an ICE train from Berlin to Vienna in 2018.

The train's name, Berolina, is the New Latin name for Berlin and the allegorical female figure symbolizing the city.

History
Initially, the Berolina was operated using DRG Class 137 diesel multiple units (Bauart Köln). By the 1970s, these had been replaced by a rake of coaches hauled by DR Class 130 locomotives.

For part of its existence, the train continued as a Schnellzug service (D 242/243) from Berlin to Paris, France, and then returned to Berlin (as D243), in each case via the Ruhr district and Belgium.  However, the name Berolina was only ever used for the section of the train's route between Warsaw and Berlin.

See also
 Vindobona (train)

 History of rail transport in Germany
 History of rail transport in Poland
 List of EuroCity services
 List of named passenger trains of Europe

References

External links
 Private web page – about the history of the DR's international trains 1977 to 1993 
 Private web page – about the history of the IEx trains 
 Moskva Express – about passenger trains to and from Moscow (includes brief discussion of the Berolina)

EuroCity
International named passenger trains
Named passenger trains of Germany
Named passenger trains of Poland
Railway services introduced in 1959
Railway services discontinued in 2002